"Grace" is a song recorded by British singer Will Young. It was written by Young and Matt Prime for his fourth studio album, Let It Go (2008), while production was helmed by Richard "Biff" Stannard and Ash Howes. The song served as the album's second single and was released on 30 November 2008. Young performed the song on The X Factor on 8 November 2008, and subsequently on Children in Need 2008. The song can be heard accompanying NatWest adverts and was also featured during the Top Gear: Bolivia Special.

Chart performance
"Grace" debuted at number 35 on the UK Singles Chart. It eventually rose up to number 33 in its fifth week of release.

Music video
A music video, directed by Kinga Burza, premiered on 1 December 2008. Shot at Addington Manor Equestrian Centre, it depicts Young winning an equestrian competition.

Track listings

Notes
 signifies a vocal producer
 signifies a additional producer

Credits and personnel
Performers

Chris Ballin – backing vocalist
Beverlei Brown – backing vocalist
Geoff Dugmore – drums
Charmain Elliott – backing vocalist
Claudia Fontaine – backing vocalist
Hazel Fernandez – backing vocalist

John Gibbons – backing vocalist
Simon Hale – conductor
Louisa Fuller – lead strings
Millennia Strings – strings 
Phil Todd – saxophone, flute
Fayyaz Virji – trombone

Technical

Niall Acott – recording engineer
David Treahearn – engineer
Richard Edgeler – mixing engineer
Ash Howes – producer

Jez Murphy – producer
Matt Prime – vocal producer, writer
Richard "Biff" Stannard – producer
 Will Young – writer

Charts

Release history

References

2008 singles
Will Young songs
Songs written by Matt Prime
Songs written by Will Young
2008 songs
Song recordings produced by Richard Stannard (songwriter)